East Mountain is a city in Upshur and Gregg counties, Texas, United States. The population was 899 at the 2020 census, up from 797 at the 2010 census.

Geography
East Mountain is located in southeastern Upshur County at  (32.603445, –94.860288). Small portions of the city extend south along Gilmer Road and Coulter Road into Gregg County. The city limits extend northwest along Main Street and Medlin Road as far as East Mountain, a  wooded summit overlooking the community.

Demographics

As of the 2020 United States census, there were 899 people, 324 households, and 250 families residing in the city.

As of the census of 2000, there were 580 people, 229 households, and 174 families residing in the city. The population density was 285.5 people per square mile (110.3/km2). There were 249 housing units at an average density of 122.6 per square mile (47.4/km2). The racial makeup of the city was 94.14% White, 1.55% African American, 0.34% Native American, 0.17% Asian, 2.76% from other races, and 1.03% from two or more races. Hispanic or Latino of any race were 3.45% of the population.

There were 229 households, out of which 28.8% had children under the age of 18 living with them, 65.9% were married couples living together, 7.0% had a female householder with no husband present, and 24.0% were non-families. 20.1% of all households were made up of individuals, and 9.6% had someone living alone who was 65 years of age or older. The average household size was 2.53 and the average family size was 2.91.

In the city, the population was spread out, with 24.7% under the age of 18, 5.7% from 18 to 24, 25.5% from 25 to 44, 29.7% from 45 to 64, and 14.5% who were 65 years of age or older. The median age was 41 years. For every 100 females, there were 91.4 males. For every 100 females age 18 and over, there were 93.4 males.

The median income for a household in the city was $33,173, and the median income for a family was $38,068. Males had a median income of $32,500 versus $21,827 for females. The per capita income for the city was $14,701. About 7.5% of families and 10.3% of the population were below the poverty line, including 15.3% of those under age 18 and 3.3% of those age 65 or over.

Education 
Most of East Mountain is in the Gilmer Independent School District but small portions of the town is also within the Union Grove and Longview Independent School Districts.

References

Cities in Texas
Cities in Upshur County, Texas
Longview metropolitan area, Texas
Cities in Gregg County, Texas